Pals is a 1925 American silent Western comedy film directed by John P. McCarthy and starring Louise Lorraine, Art Acord, and Leon De La Mothe.

Cast
 Louise Lorraine as Molly Markham
 Art Acord as Bruce Taylor
 Leon De La Mothe as Obediah Dillwater 
 Andrew Waldron as Molly's Grandpa
 Rex the Dog as Rex, Bruce's Dog
 Black Beauty as Black Beauty, Jim's Horse

References

Bibliography
 McCaffrey, Donald W. & Jacobs, Christopher P. Guide to the Silent Years of American Cinema. Greenwood Publishing, 1999. 

 Munden, Kenneth White. The American Film Institute Catalog of Motion Pictures Produced in the United States, Part 1. University of California Press, 1997.

External links
 

1925 films
1925 Western (genre) films
American black-and-white films
Films directed by John P. McCarthy
Silent American Western (genre) films
1920s English-language films
1920s American films